Mikel is the Basque adaptation of the given name Michael. Notable people with the name include:

Footballers

 Mikel Alonso (born 1980), Spanish Basque footballer and older brother of retired Spanish international Xabi Alonso
 Mikel Álvaro (born 1982), Spanish footballer
 Mikel Amantegui (born 1979), Spanish footballer
 Mikel Aranburu (born 1979), Spanish Basque retired footballer, who played for Real Sociedad
 Mikel Arce (born 1984), Spanish footballer
 Mikel Arteta (born 1982), retired Spanish Basque footballer, currently head coach at Arsenal F.C.
 Mikel Arruabarrena (born 1983), Spanish Basque footballer
 Mikel Balenziaga (born 1988), Spanish Basque footballer
 Mikel Dañobeitia Martín (born 1986), Spanish footballer
 Mikel González (born 1985), Spanish Basque footballer
 Mikel John Obi (born 1987), Nigerian footballer
 Mikel Kortina (born 1974), Spanish retired footballer
 Mikel Labaka (born 1980), Spanish Basque footballer
 Mikel Lasa (born 1971), Spanish retired footballer
 Mikele Leigertwood (born 1982), Antiguan retired footballer
 Mikel Leshoure (born 1990), American footballer, currently playing for the Detroit Lions in the NFL
 Mikel Merino (born 1996), Spanish footballer
 Mikel Orbegozo (born 1989), Spanish footballer
 Mikel Oyarzabal (born 1997), Spanish footballer, currently playing for Real Sociedad
 Mikel Pagola, Spanish footballer
 Mikel Rico Moreno (born 1984), Spanish footballer
 Mikel Roteta (born 1970), Spanish retired footballer
 Mikel Saizar (born 1983), Spanish Basque footballer
 Mikel San José (born 1989), Spanish Basque footballer, currently playing for Athletic Bilbao
 Mikel Spaho (born 1982), Albanian footballer
 Mikel Vesga (born 1993), Spanish footballer

Other sportsmen

 Mikel Aguirrezabalaga (born 1984),  Spanish handball player
 Mikel Artetxe (born 1976), Spanish cyclist
 Mikel Astarloza (born 1979), Spanish cyclist
 Mikele Barber (born 1980), American sprinter
 Mikel Gaztañaga (born 1979), Spanish cyclist
 Mikel Landa (born 1989), Spanish cyclist
 Mikel Nieve (born 1984), Spanish cyclist
 Mikel Odriozola (born 1973), Spanish race walker
 Mikel Pradera (born 1975), Spanish cyclist
 Mikel Scicluna (1929 – 2010), Maltese professional wrestler
 Mikel Thomas (born 1987), Trinidadian sprinter
 Mikel Zarrabeitia (born 1970), Spanish cyclist

Musicians

 Mikel Erentxun (born 1965), Venezuelan musician
 Mikel Herzog (born 1960), Spanish musician
 Mikel Japp (1952 – 2012), Welsh musician
 Mikel Laboa (1934 – 2008), Spanish musician
 Mikelangelo Loconte (born 1973), Italian musician
 Mikel Rouse (born 1957), American composer
 Mikel Jollett (born 1974), American musician and author

Others

 Mikelis Avlichos
 Mikel Bronzoulis
 Mikel Conrad
 Mikel Dufrenne
 Mikel Dunham
 Mikel Iglesias
 Mikel Koliqi
 Mikel Lejarza
 Mikel Urizarbarrena

See also
 Mikel Coffee Company, Greek chain of coffee houses operating in several countries
 Mikal (given name)
 Michael

Basque masculine given names